Wapadrand is a suburb of the city of Pretoria, South Africa. Located to the east of Lynnwood in a leafy, established area that is home to some affordable real estate. The neighborhood was named after old wagon ruts in the area at the suggestion of one of its founders, the architect Koos Reyneke.

References

Suburbs of Pretoria